Steve J. Stern (born 1947) is an author from Memphis, Tennessee.  Much of his work draws inspiration from Yiddish folklore.

Biography 

Stern was born in Memphis, Tennessee in 1947, the son of a grocer.  He left Memphis in the 1960s to attend college, then to travel the US and Europe and ending on a hippie commune in the Ozarks.  He went on to study writing in the graduate program at the University of Arkansas, at a time when it included several notable writers who've since become prominent, including poet C.D. Wright and fiction writers Ellen Gilchrist, Lewis Nordan, Lee K. Abbott and Jack Butler.

Stern subsequently moved to London, England, before returning to Memphis in his thirties to accept a job at a local folklore center.  There he learned about the city's old Jewish ghetto, The Pinch, and began to steep himself in Yiddish folklore.  He published his first book, the story collection Isaac and the Undertaker's Daughter, which was based in The Pinch, in 1983.  It won the Pushcart Writers' Choice Award and acclaim from some notable critics, including Susan Sontag, who praised the book's "brio ... whiplash sentences ... energy and charm..."

By decade's end Stern had won the O. Henry Award, two Pushcart Prize awards, published more collections, including Lazar Malkin Enters Heaven (which won the Edward Lewis Wallant Award for Jewish American Fiction) and the novel Harry Kaplan's Adventures Underground, and was being hailed by critics, such as Cynthia Ozick, as the successor to Isaac Bashevis Singer.  Stern's 2000 collection The Wedding Jester won the National Jewish Book Award in 1999, and his novel The Angel of Forgetfulness was named one of the best books of 2005 by The Washington Post.

Stern, who teaches at Skidmore College, has also won some notable scholarly awards, including a Fulbright fellowships and the Guggenheim foundations Fellowship. He currently lives in Ballston Spa, New York, and his latest work, the novel The Pinch, was published in 2015.

Works 
 Isaac and the Undertaker's Daughter (Lost Roads Publishers, 1983)
 The Moon & Ruben Shein (August House, 1984)
 Lazar Malkin Enters Heaven (Viking, 1986)
 Mickey and the Golem (St. Lukes Press, 1986) (children's book)
 Hershel and the Beast (Ion Books, 1987) (children's book)
 Harry Kaplan's Adventures Under Ground (Ticknor & Fields, 1991)
 A Plague of Dreamers: Three Novellas (Scribner's, 1994)
 The Wedding Jester (Graywolf Press, 1999)
 The Angel of Forgetfulness (Viking, 2006)
 The North of God (Melville House Publishing, 2008) 
 The Frozen Rabbi (Algonquin Books of Chapel Hill, 2010)
 The Book of Mischief (Graywolf Press, 2012)
 The Pinch (Graywolf Press, 2015)

References

External links 
 Audio: Steve Stern at the Key West Literary Seminar, 2007
 "Dybuks in Dixie". Profile of Steve Stern from The New York Times, March 1, 1987
 "Tugging at Jewish Weeds: An interview with Steve Stern". from MELUS, the Society for the Study of the Multi-Ethnic Literature of the United States, Spring 2007
 "Journeying to the Other Side: A Q & A with Steve Stern" in The Jewish Forward, May 29, 2008
 "The Angel of Forgetfulness". Michael Dirda on Steve Stern in The Washington Post, April 3, 2005
 "He's a Literary Darling Looking for Dear Readers", a profile of Steve Stern from The New York Times, April 25, 2005

1947 births
Living people
Jewish American novelists
Writers from Memphis, Tennessee
University of Arkansas alumni
American male novelists
American male short story writers
20th-century American novelists
21st-century American novelists
20th-century American short story writers
21st-century American short story writers
20th-century American male writers
21st-century American male writers
Novelists from Tennessee
21st-century American Jews